Lists of Colombian department governors cover governors of the Departments of Colombia. They are organized by department.

Present governors

 List of Colombian Department Governors

By department
 Governor of Atlántico
 List of Governors of Cesar Department
 List of Governors of Huila Department
 List of governors of La Guajira Department
 List of Governors of Norte de Santander Department
 List of Governors of Quindío Department
 List of Governors of Valle del Cauca Department

See also

List of entities in the executive branch of Colombia